René Belletto (born 11 September 1945 in Lyon) is a French writer, and winner of the Prix Femina, 1986, for L'Enfer.

References

External links 
 René Belleto on the site of Éditions P.O.L

Writers from Lyon
1945 births
Living people
20th-century French novelists
20th-century French male writers
21st-century French novelists
French crime fiction writers
Prix Femina winners
Prix du Livre Inter winners
French male novelists
21st-century French male writers